D515 is a state road in Slavonia region of Croatia connecting Našice and Đakovo, i.e. the D2 and D7 state roads.

The road, as well as all other state roads in Croatia, is managed and maintained by Hrvatske ceste, state owned company.

Traffic volume 

Traffic is regularly counted and reported by Hrvatske ceste, operator of the road.

Road junctions and populated areas

Sources

State roads in Croatia
Osijek-Baranja County